Ashley Parker Angel is an American musician and actor who rose to prominence as a member of the boyband O-Town. After the band dissolved he had a brief solo music career, and was the only former band member who declined to go on a reunion tour with O-Town in 2011. Parker Angel has acted in several Broadway productions since 2007, and most recently appeared in Wicked as the lead male character Fiyero Tigelaar.

Early years
Ashley Parker Angel is the child of Darren and Paula Parker. His grandparents are of German and Irish descent. Ashley was named after the fictional character Ashley Wilkes, his mother's favorite character from Margaret Mitchell's 1936 novel Gone with the Wind, and the classic film of the same title. When Ashley was three years old, his parents divorced. His mother later remarried, and Ashley was legally adopted by his stepfather, Ron Angel, who is of American Indian descent. He then legally assumed the name Ashley Parker-Angel. He has two brothers, Taylor and Justin and two sisters, Annie and Emily.

From a very early age, Ashley studied the piano, as his mother Paula was a successful piano teacher with many students of her own. He was by nature active and adventurous. In one incident, at the age of nine he inadvertently set fire to his elementary school's football and soccer fields due to the explosion of a model rocket he had launched on school property; local police charged him with a misdemeanor.

Career

O-Town and Making the Band
In 2000 Ashley Parker Angel achieved fame on the hit ABC series Making the Band, which tracked the formation of a pop music group. The MTV production was the first reality show to be picked up by a major television network. Weekly, viewers saw Angel, after first being plucked from tens of thousands of other auditionees, survive each stage of the selection process to become one of the "final five" members of the new vocal group O-Town.

Ratings were strong, and as a result O-Town quickly achieved success; by the end of the first season, the group had inked a record deal with music legend Clive Davis and became the debut act for Davis' new label J Records. The album O-Town, boosted by the weekly TV publicity, debuted at No. 5 on Billboard and went on to multi-platinum status. "Liquid Dreams," the album's first release, crowned the SoundScan singles chart at No. 1, selling over 42,000 units in one week. The group won the 2001 Teen Choice Award for Breakthrough Artist.

Because of O-Town, J Records made musical history as the first label in SoundScan history (1991 and on) to have its first single release debut at No. 1 on the sales charts. Also, O-Town is the first artist in SoundScan history to have its first single come in at No. 1, an achievement recorded in the 2002 Guinness Book of World Records.

In late spring 2001, the second single, "All or Nothing," and became the biggest hit of O-Town's career. The song reached No. 1 on the U.S. top 40 chart and was nominated for numerous awards, including Song of the Year during the 2001 Radio Music Awards.

The group toured internationally, and went on to be the first reality show cast to remain unchanged for a second and third season. Near the end of the third season, viewers watched O-Town striving to take their careers to the next level, writing their own music, earning the respect of industry peers, and marketing themselves as more than a "boy band." Unfortunately, by the time of the release of their second album, O2, the teen-pop genre had begun to fade, and they did not find the acceptance they sought. Despite moderate success, O2 got nowhere near the market impact of their first album. In November 2003 J Records dropped the band from the label.

In January 2011, O-Town confirmed their reunion plans, four days after confirming the band had gotten back together Ashley released a statement via TMZ.com that he wouldn't be reuniting with the band causing an uproar with the fans and media due to Ashley being a key member during O-Town.

O-Town was one of the greatest chapters of my life, so when the idea of a reunion was brought to me, of course I was intrigued. However I have made the decision not to be a part of an O-Town reunion. It was a difficult decision, but ultimately necessary to move on with the next chapter of my career

Solo music career and There and Back (2004–06)

In 2004, Ashley had secured a record deal with Blackground/Universal Records, and later that year MTV began filming There and Back, a reality series tracking his pursuit of solo stardom. The show documented Parker's struggle to transcend his mostly teen idol image, showcasing him as a serious songwriter and musician who co-wrote every track of his album. The series was backlit by the relationship between him and his then-pregnant fiancée (the engagement has since been broken off) and the obstacles of early fatherhood, and also captured the drama and birth of his son Lyric.

In April 2006, Parker was selected to be a contestant on NBC's Celebrity Cooking Showdown, produced by entertainment mogul/rapper Diddy; Angel placed second, even though he is seen severely lacerating his finger during one of the timed cooking challenges. Shortly thereafter, he competed in the Kelly Slater Celebrity Surf Invitational, in which he had another severe injury, this time a foot laceration.

In May 2006, his solo album Soundtrack to Your Life was released, debuting at No. 5 on Billboard and receiving many positive reviews. Billboard'''s review called it "great melodic rock ... falling somewhere between the earnest balladeering of the Goo Goo Dolls and the driving rock of the All American Rejects." The first single release, "Let U Go," was a hit; its video spent weeks at No. 1 on MTV's TRL and the single had the third-highest-selling debut of 2006. In spring of that year, Parker toured throughout North America with Ashlee Simpson.

Parker was featured as a character in the Clone High episode "Gate Expectations". In the episode, he hosts a teen dance show which is set on the sunny beaches of Canada, where it's always "a balmy 32 degrees". Parker is described in the episode as being like "The Beatles and Jesus all rolled into one."

On Broadway and Theatre (2007–)
In January 2007, Ashley Parker Angel joined the eight-time Tony Award–winning musical Hairspray, playing the lead character's love interest, teen heartthrob Link Larkin. The New York Post assessed Angel's performance as "an absolute charmer." Angel's presence on Broadway also led the New York Times to do a feature on the singer-songwriter turned actor. The Hairspray producers asked Angel to extend his contract four times. In early 2008, Parker sustained a back injury onstage, forcing him to leave the show for a few months, but he returned to finish the last few weeks of his latest contract, giving the actor a successful run in the show for more than a year.

During his stay in New York, Parker performed at several other Broadway-related events, including Broadway in Bryant Park and Broadway on Broadway.

In November 2014, Parker Angel joined the globally award-winning touring version of the musical Wicked, playing the part of the male lead character Fiyero Tigelaar. His debut on the tour was at Chrysler Hall in Norfolk, Virginia for 16 shows, he has since gone on to perform at Detroit, MI, Durham, NC, Greenville, SC, Atlanta, GA and Miami, FL with the current Munchkinland Tour. He reprised the role in January 2016 in Charlotte for 3 weeks. He returned to the role once again on July 31, 2017, in the Broadway production and remained with the show through July 14, 2018.

Acting (2009–)

As a child, Parker was the voice of the main character Alex in the video game Lunar: The Silver Star and Lunar: Silver Star Story.

In 2007 during his run on Broadway Angel began taking acting classes after finding acting during the show fun and challenging. In June 2009, Parker signed for his first major acting role as Carson Wheetly for the movie Wild Things: Foursome (originally titled, Wild Things: Criss-Cross) by Sony, filmed in Miami over two months.

On June 20, 2009, Parker guest starred as pop singer Danny Starr in the "Danny Starr / Quinceañera" episode of the children's cartoon Handy Manny on the Disney Channel. In this episode, he sang an original song  called "Twisty Turn Twist", which he co-wrote for the show.

In late March 2010 Parker was cast in the role of Todd for family movie Pizza Man starring Frankie Muniz filmed in Los Angeles. Pizza Man was due for theatrical release in late 2011 but later released on DVD in 2014.

In February 2011 Parker filmed his third movie Amelia's 25th, he plays the role of Jacob, the movie was first released on Video on Demand then DVD in 2013.

In March 2014 Parker filmed a short in the Mojave Desert Trona, he plays the role of Tommy, the short incomplete, waiting for film festival releases.

Mansions of Arcadia (2012)
As of 2012 Parker has been working with Xandy Barry on a new joint Band project titled MOA standing for Mansions of Arcadia. He released a 20-second clip in January 2012 of their debut release "Don't Let Me Down".

In 2014, Parker Angel confirmed that he was songwriting whilst being signed to EMI Publishing, he will be releasing a second album in the future, although the status of Mansions of Arcadia is currently unknown due to their official website and social pages no longer being active or online. 2017– he now is acting on Broadway as Fiyero in Wicked at the Gershwin Theater.

Personal life
Ashley was engaged to model Tiffany Lynn after a five-year relationship which ended in June 2008. In 2005, Lynn gave birth to their son, Lyric Lennon Parker-Angel. Lyric is an actor who plays Lachlan Drake on American Horror Story: Hotel.

Discography

Albums
2006 – Soundtrack to Your Life''

Singles
2006 – "Let U Go"
2006 – "Soundtrack to Your Life"
2006 – "Where Did You Go"
2012 – "Don't Let Me Down" (with Mansions of Arcadia)
2013 – "Switchblade" (with DJ Danny McCarthy)

Filmography

Television and video games

Theater

References

External links
 
 
 MOA official website

Living people
American male singer-songwriters
American male video game actors
American male voice actors
American people of German descent
American people of Irish descent
O-Town members
Participants in American reality television series
21st-century American male actors
20th-century American male singers
21st-century American male singers
20th-century American singers
21st-century American singers
Year of birth missing (living people)